Finnegan is an Irish surname coming from the Gaelic Ó Fionnagáin, meaning "son of fairhaired", or Fionnagán, from the diminutive personal name of Fionn, meaning "fairhaired".

History
The majority of Ulster and Leinster Finnegans are descended from the Ó Fionnagáin sept, established on the borders of the ancient kingdoms of Breffni and Oriel. Their patrimony comprised the district where the three counties of Cavan, Meath and Monaghan meet. Frequently mentioned in the Irish Annals, they were able to retain most of their lands until the middle of the 16th century, when the present counties were formed. Over a hundred years later, when Petty’s census was compiled, Finnegan was still recorded as a principal surname in counties Cavan and Monaghan. Near the close of the 12th century, a branch of this family migrated southward, settling in Wicklow. Although no longer numerous in that county, during the Middle Ages they were a sept of considerable importance. An entry in the “Annals of Loch Cé” relating to County Wicklow describes Newcastle O’Finnegan. Tudor and Elizabethan fiants and other contemporary 16th and 17th century records list members of the family among the landed gentry of east Leinster.

In medieval Ireland, there were two prominent Finnegan septs, both of whose descendants are found in considerable numbers in their original homelands. The Connacht family of Ó Fionnagáin was seated in northeast Roscommon and the adjacent areas of Galway. Of Uí Fiachrach lineage, they stemmed from Fiachra, son of Eochaidh Muighmheadhoin, King of Ireland in the mid-4th century and father of Daithi, last pagan monarch of the country. Chiefs in this sept held sway over a territory encompassing an extensive portion of the baronies of Castlereagh, County Roscommon, and Ballymoe in Galway. Place names Ballyfinnegan, one in each barony, attest to this family’s predominance in the region.

Notable people with the surname
 Brandon Finnegan (born 1993), American baseball player
 Casey Finnegan (1890–1958), American football coach
 Chris Finnegan (1944–2009), English boxer
 Christian Finnegan (born 1973), American comedian
 Cortland Finnegan (born 1984), American football player
 Edward Rowan Finnegan, attorney and politician from Illinois
 George Finnegan (1881–1913), American boxer
 James Finnegan, multiple people
 Jean Finnegan, Australian scientist
 John Finnegan, multiple people
 Joseph Finnegan, multiple people
 Kevin Finnegan (1948–2008), English boxer
 Kyle Finnegan (born 1991), American baseball player
 Larry Finnegan (1938–1973), American pop singer
 Martin Finnegan, Irish motorcycle road racer
 Michael Finnegan, multiple people
 Mick Finnegan, president of the Workers' Party of Ireland
 Patrick Finnegan, United States military officer and educator
 Shonnie Finnegan, American archivist
 William Finnegan (born 1952), American author and journalist

Others
 "Michael Finnegan", a non-stop children's song
 Tim Finnegan, a fictional character, central to James Joyce’s Finnegans Wake

References

Surnames of Irish origin
Anglicised Irish-language surnames
Irish families